Holiday Island is an Australian television series made by Crawford Productions for Network Ten. The show aired twice weekly from 1981 to 1982, with the first episode going to air on 17 June 1981.

Series synopsis 
Like preceding Crawford's series, the aborted Hotel Story, Holiday Island  was a Love Boat-style drama series set in a luxury hotel. This time the location was a tropical resort island in Queensland. In each episode the regular characters - the various islanders and hotel workers - hosted a new batch of guest star hotel guests. Various plots and situations on the show included a fierce cyclone hitting the island, children being kidnapped, a siege where the hotel workers were held hostage by less than pleasant guests, drug trafficking, the resort being terrorised by a biker gang and a politician dying of a heart attack while staying at the island's resort.

The series became notorious amongst critics for its allegedly poor production values, and the wintry conditions under which the tropical drama was shot became the focus of most jibes. Though set in a tropical hotel with palm trees, sunshine and beautiful beaches, for practical reasons all interiors scenes - and the bulk of exterior scenes - were shot at the Ten Network's studios in Nunawading, Melbourne. The exterior set made heavy use of awnings in an attempt to disguise Melbourne's propensity for overcast skies, but attempts to mask the icy breath of the bathing beauties was not always successful. Attempts to shoot location footage in Queensland were hampered by the fact that the local television crews assigned to the shoot had experience only in shooting news footage, and the fact that heavy rain fell for several days of a planned shoot. Ray Meagher, a guest star in the show's first episode, later jokingly referred to the show as Horror Day on Iceland.

Location footage in Queensland was taken at the Tangalooma Island Resort on Moreton Island, east of Brisbane Queensland. The "Tangalooma Ship-Wrecks" were often seen chroma-keyed as a background to the studio sequences of 'Banjo's' beachside shack.

Cast 
Regular cast:
 Nick Tate - Neil Scott
 Tom Oliver - Wally Simmons
 Peter Mochrie - Tony 'Zack' Zackarakis
 Alyson Best - Lisa Kendall
 Frank Wilson - Banjo Paterson
 Patricia Kennedy - Emily Muldoon
 Caz Lederman - Angela Scott
 Steven Grives - Jason Scott
 Gaynor Martin - Kylie McArthur
 Marilyn Mayo - Dusty Davis
 Brian James - George Tippett
 Olga Tamara - Victoria Buckland
 Ronne Arnold - Alex Utalo
 Tracy Mann - Wendy Robinson

Guest cast
Ray MeagherJudy NunnRowena WallaceLisa CrittendenRebecca GillingAnne PhelanJune SalterJohn BlackmanPenne Hackforth-JonesTracy Mann.

Cancellation 
Holiday Island was cancelled after 64 episodes. The set was later revamped and turned into the Lassiter's Complex featured in the soap opera, Neighbours.

Reruns 

Network Ten which was the TV series original broadcast channel replayed the Holiday Island TV series during the later part of 1989 at the graveyard time-slot of 4.00am weekday mornings. It had not been replayed until WIN TV began to show the entire series during 2006 as part of its early morning Crawfords Australian Classic series.

From January 2006 to March 2007, the WIN Television network repeated Holiday Island on early Saturday mornings from 2.00am before changing to 3.00am during the later half of 2006 as part of its Crawford's Australian Classics series.

References

External links
Aussie Soap Archive: Holiday Island
Crawford Productions
Holiday Island at the National Film and Sound Archive

Australian drama television series
Network 10 original programming
Television shows set in Queensland
Australian television soap operas
1981 Australian television series debuts
1982 Australian television series endings
Television series by Crawford Productions
English-language television shows